Bid Boland (also Romanized as Bīd Boland and Bīd-e Boland; also known as Burj Bīdu Buland) is a village in Jam Rural District, in the Central District of Jam County, Bushehr Province, Iran. At the 2006 census, its population was 58, in 9 families.

References 

fa;بیدبلند

Populated places in Jam County